Prof. Akio Katayama (片山章雄) (born 1957, Hokkaido), a Japanese historian. He is a Professor of Oriental History and Inner Asian Studies at Tokai University.

His research fields include Ancient Turkic inscriptions, Turfan documents, and Otani expeditions.

Education and career
Katayama has been a professor at the History department in Tokai University Faculty of Letters since 1995. He holds a graduate degree from Sophia University's Graduate School of Letters (1985). His main research areas include Central Asian history, historical Chinese-Central Asia relations, and Turkic tribes of Central Asia. Between 2013 and 2014, he undertook a joint research project with Turkish historian Erdal Küçükyalçın (Japan Foundation fellow); titled "Otani Kozui's Life and Achievements (1876-1948)" (Japanese: 西本願寺第二十二門主・大谷光瑞の生涯（1876-1948）).

Publications
 Kaikotsu tariato shine usu ryo hibun no tekisuto fukugen to nendaiki kara mita kita higashi chuou ajia (1994) …『迴鶻タリアト・シネ=ウス両碑文のテキスト復原と年代記から見た北・東・中央アジア』
 Kindai ajia nihon kankei ni okeru Otani Kozui no ashiato shiryo no kisoteki seiri (1999)...『近代アジア・日本関係における大谷光瑞の足跡資料の基礎的整理』 （1999）
 Ryojun hakubutsukan syozo no Otani tankentai shorai Torufan shutsudo bukka bunsho (Tokai shigaku No.42 2007)...「旅順博物館所蔵の大谷探検隊将来吐魯番出土物価文書」（『西北出土文献研究』第4 号、2007）
 Tachibana Zuicho no Rouran kinpen no tousa to kankei suru kiroku bunnmotsu (1) (Tokai shigaku No.42 2008)...「橘瑞超の楼蘭近辺の踏査と関係する記録・文物（１）」（『東海史学』第42号、2008）
 Shinmatsu seiritsu no Shisen kara chibetto eno ruto wo kaita teitan ezu no kisoteki kenkyu, Yokohama no Rocho yori ushizo ni itaru teitan yozu to Pekin no Daruchendo e itaru ru-to no hikaku kenkyu...編集報告書：『清末成立の四川からチベットへのルートを描いた程站絵図の基礎的研究― 横浜の『自鑪庁至烏斯蔵程站輿図』と北京の『自打箭鑪至前後蔵途程図』の比較研究―』 （2008）

References

 http://www.hum.u-tokai.ac.jp/oriental/stf_katayama.html
 http://researchmap.jp/read0026479/
 https://web.archive.org/web/20151222135548/http://repo.lib.ryukoku.ac.jp/jspui/bitstream/10519/1481/1/r-bbk-ky_048_008.pdf
 https://www.jpf.go.jp/j/project/intel/study/fellowship/2013/middle_east.html

20th-century Japanese historians
1957 births
Living people
People from Hokkaido
Academic staff of Tokai University
21st-century Japanese historians